Jaikishan Kakubhai Shroff (born 1 February 1957), popularly known as Jackie Shroff, is an Indian actor and former model. He has won four Filmfare Awards among other accolades. He became an overnight star with Subhash Ghai's Hero (1983) film, and eventually established himself as one of the leading men of Indian cinema from 1980s to 1990s.

Early and personal life 
Shroff was born as Jaikishan Kakubhai Shroff in Bombay (present Mumbai), India. His father, Kakubhai Haribhai Shroff, was Gujarati, while his mother was a Turkmen who fled from Kazakhstan (then the Kazakh Soviet Socialist Republic under the Russian Soviet Union) during a coup. His maternal grandmother escaped to Ladakh along with her seven daughters when there was a coup in Kazakhstan. They migrated to Delhi, and finally to Mumbai. His father came from a Gujarati family of merchants and traders. However, they lost all of their money in the stock market and his father had to leave home at the age of 17. His father met his mother when both were teenagers and got married.

As a youngster, he modelled in a few advertisements including Savage perfumes. It was one of his classmates in school who gave Shroff his name "Jackie" and then filmmaker Subhash Ghai stuck to this name when he launched him in the film Hero. Shroff regularly revisits his childhood home in Teen Batti.

Shroff married his longtime girlfriend Ayesha Dutt, a model who later became a film producer, on her birthday, 5 June 1987. The couple runs a media company Jackie Shroff Entertainment Limited. They jointly owned 10% shares in Sony TV from its launch until 2012, when they sold their stake and ended their 15-year-long association with Sony TV. They have two children: a daughter Krishna Shroff, and a son, Bollywood actor Tiger Shroff.

Career 
Jackie Shroff dropped out of school after his 11th standard as his family did not have much money. He tried his hand working as an apprentice chef at Taj Hotels and as a flight attendant at Air India, but he was rejected from both places because of his lack of qualifications. He then started working as a travel agent in a local company called "Trade Wings" near Jehangir Art Gallery. An advertising agency accountant spotted him at the bus stand and asked him if he would be interested in modelling. The next day, Shroff went to the advertising agency (National advertising agency) located in the same building as Davar's college near Flora Fountain for the photo shoot during his lunch time. This photo shoot for a suit shirt launched Shroff on his modelling path. In 1982, Shroff made his acting debut in Dev Anand's movie Swami Dada. In 1983, Subhash Ghai cast him in the lead role for the movie Hero, paired against Meenakshi Sheshadri. The film was a major critical and commercial success, and one of the highest grossers of 1983. By Hero, both Shroff and Seshadri had become overnight stars.  He continued to work in Subhash Ghai movies, irrespective of any role that was offered. After Hero, he did several other films, such as Andar Baahar. Jaanoo and Yudh were successful. In 1986 he did Karma which became the highest-grossing film of 1986. His next film to be released was Kaash. Later films, such as Dahleez and Sachché Ká Bol-Bálá were critically acclaimed, but failed at the box office. But he came back to success through films such as Ram Lakhan, Tridev and Parinda, which won him filmfare award for best actor. In the 90s he was part of successful films such as Saudagar, Angaar, Sapne Sajan Ke, Gardish, Khalnayak, 1942: A Love Story, Rangeela, Agnisakshi, Border & Shapath.

In 2006, Shroff acted in the children's film Bhoot Unkle.

In 2010 he appeared in film Bhoot and Friends. In 2011 he did a cameo role in film Shraddha In The Name Of God directed by Gurubhai Thakkar.

In 2017, Shroff made his debut in Konkani, acting in the film Soul Curry, which even won him an award. Subsequently, he is to act in another Konkani film scheduled to release in 2019, titled Kantaar.

In October 2018, he acted in a short film, The Playboy Mr. Sawhney. He was also seen in Paltan. He is to feature in many films in 2019, like  Firrkie, Bharat, Saaho, and Romeo Akbar Walter. He is also going to star in Prasthanam, which Hindi remake of Telugu film with same name alongside Ali Fazal and Sanjay Dutt.

Television 
Shroff has hosted many television shows like Lehrein, Chirtrahar and Missing. Dealing with stories of missing people who were never found, Missing was popular for its creative narration by Shroff. The show was broadcast on Sony TV, of which he owned some shares. Shroff was also a judge on the magic show India's Magic Star, broadcast on Indian channel STAR One. The show began on 3 July 2010 and ended on 5 September 2010. In 2014, Shroff and his son Tiger Shroff made an appearance on Comedy Nights with Kapil. In 2019 Shroff made his digital debut with the series Criminal Justice.

Other ventures

Social activism 
He has an organic farm, where he grows organic plants, trees and herbs. He is also the brand ambassador of Thalassemia India and over the years has supported many causes like HIV/AIDS awareness and abolishment of female foeticide. He has also funded the treatment and education of many underprivileged children.
On 5 March 2021, Shroff donated an ambulance to a Lonavala-based animal shelter in the memory of his late pet dog Rocky.

Awards and accolades 

 1990: Won: Filmfare Award for Best Actor – Parinda
 1994: Nominated: Filmfare Award for Best Actor – Gardish
 1994: Nominated: Filmfare Award for Best Supporting Actor – Khalnayak
 1995: Won: Filmfare Award for Best Supporting Actor – 1942: A Love Story
 1996: Won: Filmfare Award for Best Supporting Actor – Rangeela
 1997: Nominated: Filmfare Award for Best Supporting Actor – Agni Sakshi
 2002: Nominated: Filmfare Award for Best Supporting Actor – Yaadein
 2001: Nominated: Filmfare Award for Best Performance in a Negative Role – Mission Kashmir
 2003: Nominated: Filmfare Award for Best Supporting Actor – Devdas
 2007: Special Honour Jury Award for outstanding contribution to Indian cinema
 2011: Won: Vikatan Awards for Best Villain – Aaranya Kaandam
 2014: Won: The Original Rockstar GQ
 2016: Won: HT Most Stylish Living Legend Award.
 2017: Won: Raj Kapoor Award – Received by actress Raakhee: 30 April 2017.
 2017: Won: Received the 20th anniversary of JP Dutta's Border movie Award: 12 June 2017.
 2017: Won: Recipient of National Award-Hindi Cinema Gaurav Samman at Vigyan Bhawan
 2018: Won: Filmfare Short Film Award for Best Actor — Khujli
 2018: Won: Best Actor Award for the Konkani film Soul Curry at Goa State Awards ceremony

He has received a Doctor of Arts for his valuable contribution in the field of Cinema from the Invertis University.

Filmography

References

External links 

 
 

1957 births
Living people
Indian male film actors
Indian male models
Film producers from Mumbai
Gujarati people
Indian people of Turkic descent
Male actors from Mumbai
Male actors in Bengali cinema
Male actors in Hindi cinema
Male actors in Kannada cinema
Male actors in Malayalam cinema
Male actors in Marathi cinema
Male actors in Tamil cinema
Male actors in Telugu cinema
Male actors in Odia cinema
Male actors in Punjabi cinema
Male actors in Bhojpuri cinema
Male actors in Gujarati-language films
20th-century Indian male actors
21st-century Indian male actors
Filmfare Awards winners
People named in the Pandora Papers